Les dernières volontés de Mozart (English: The Last Will of Mozart) or LDVM (Symphony) is the fifth studio album by Congolese-French singer and rapper Gims, which was released on 2 December 2022 on the TF1 Musique and Play Two labels.

Genesis 
On 5 October 2022, Gims revealed the album's title, its release date and its cover. At the same time, the pre-order of the record was made available, accompanied by three tickets, gold, platinum and diamond to be won.

History 
On 28 September 2022, Gims unveiled a date on social networks, 09/30. On 30 September 2022, Gims released the single "Maintenant". On 10 November 2022, he unveils "Thémistocle" and announces the release of the clip the next day, 11 November at 1:00 p.m.

On 14 November 2022, he unveiled part of the album's tracklist containing 14 titles and three collaborations with Carla Bruni, Soolking and Tayc. In reality, the album contains a total of 18 tracks but only 14 have been revealed so far.

On 25 November 2022, two titles are revealed "Après-vous madame" featuring Soolking and "Demain" with Carla Bruni. The album was released on 2 December 2022, containing 18 tracks and three features with Soolking, Carla Bruni and Tayc.

Track listing

Charts

Weekly charts

Year-end charts

References 

2022 albums
Gims albums
French-language albums